Greta Bridge is a village on the River Greta in County Durham, England.

Geography and administration
Greta Bridge lies in the Pennine hills near to Barnard Castle. The bridge (now bypassed by the A66 trunk road) is over the River Greta just south of its confluence with the River Tees.

Greta Bridge lies within the historic county boundaries of the North Riding of Yorkshire, but along with the rest of the former Startforth Rural District, Greta Bridge was transferred to County Durham for administrative and ceremonial purposes on 1 April 1974 pursuant to the Local Government Act 1972.

Etymology
The village is named after the river and is Norse in derivation, from grót + á meaning "stony stream".

History
A Roman fort and associated vicus (ancient name unknown) were located here, next to the major Roman road that became the modern A66.

Greta Bridge is mentioned in Charles Dickens's novel The Life and Adventures of Nicholas Nickleby as the site of Dotheboys School. Dickens mentions the "George and New Inn, Greta Bridge". This is thought to be a conflation of two coaching inns in or near Greta Bridge.

The famous painting the Rokeby Venus by Diego Velázquez was originally housed at Rokeby Park, near Greta Bridge. It is now in the National Gallery in London.

1 mile north is Mortham Tower, a fortified manor house dating from the 14th century, with a 15th-century tower.

References

Villages in County Durham